Colbourne is a surname. Notable people with the surname include:

Bill Colbourne (1895–1979), Australian political organizer and trade unionist
Mark Colbourne (born 1969), Welsh Paralympic cyclist
Maurice Colbourne (1939–1989), English actor

See also
Colborne (surname)